The Bear's Tale is a 1940 Warner Bros. Merrie Melodies animated cartoon short, directed by Tex Avery. The short was released on April 13, 1940, and stars the Three Bears.

Plot
In the opening sequence, the Cast frame quotes "Miss Goldilocks appears through the courtesy of The Mervin LeBoy Productions".  This is in reference to Mervyn LeRoy, the film producer.

Once upon a time, in a comical re-creation of the traditional tale, Goldilocks and the Three Bears, we see a quaint cottage where Papa Bear, Mama Bear, and Baby Bear live. They're all sitting at the breakfast table in anticipation of getting their porridge, when a bowl of porridge drops onto the table in front of each of them.  Having surmised that the porridge is too hot to eat, the Bears decide to take a ride.  While looking in the mirror, Mama dons her hat and turns the mirror over to see how it looks from the back (in the mirror we see a reflection of her back side).  As they all head for the door, Baby exits from the small door, Mama from the medium-sized door, and Papa from the large door.  We see them riding through the forest on a tricycle when Mama and Papa decide to take a break from pedalling, leaving Baby to relentlessly power the tricycle (out of fear of having an accident).

Goldilocks appears, skipping carelessly through the forest when she comes upon the Bears' cottage and knocks on the door.  And who is home?  None other than the Big Bad Wolf from the tale of Little Red Riding Hood in bed wearing Grandma's nightgown and cap!  He says in a deep voice, "Come in Little Red...", coughs, then in a soft female voice, "Come in Little Red Riding Hood!"  As Goldilocks opens the door, the wolf looks surprised and says, "What is this, a frame-up?  Who are you?".  Goldilocks introduces herself and says, "Isn't this where the Three Bears live?".  Sarcastically, the Wolf replies, "Nah, this isn't where the Three Bears live! That outfit lives two miles down the road at the first stop signal!"  He shoos Goldilocks out the door before she spoils everything.

When the Wolf realizes that she's Goldilocks from the story by the same name, he heads over to the Three Bears' cottage by hailing a taxi, and says, "To the three Bear's house, and step on it!  I'll take care of any tickets!".  When he arrives, he sneaks in the window and takes his place in the Baby's bed.

As the three Bears are cycling home, Papa Bear imitates a police car siren, but can't contain his laughter because it sounds so corny, so Mama slaps him in the face from behind.  When they arrive, Goldilocks opens the door as we see the Wolf waiting impatiently in bed, rapping his fingers, for something to happen.

Meanwhile, Little Red Riding Hood is walking through the forest with a basket of goodies for her Grandma. She opens the door and calls to her grandmother, but she discovers that there is a note pinned to her pillow. The note reads, "Dear Red: Got tired of waiting. Have gone to Three Bears' house to eat up Little Goldilocks. Love, the Wolf".  Red immediately goes to the telephone and starts dialing. As sleepy little Golilocks (presumably from eating 3 big bowls of porridge) is climbing the stairs, the phone rings. She runs back down stairs and answers the phone. It's Red calling to warn her about the Wolf.  She passes the note to Goldilocks over the split frame and as she finishes reading the note, she shakes Red's hand and says, "Gee, thanks a lot!  See ya later!" hangs up the phone and checks the phone's coin return slot for any loose change.

The three Bears arrive home and scramble to the kitchen table, where they are surprised to find three empty bowls. From upstairs, we see the Wolf in bed, letting out a big, loud sneeze.  The Bears hear this, and determine there is a robber somewhere in the cottage and all scramble under the table to hide. As Papa gets a little courage, he tells Mama that he's going to go upstairs to take care of the crook.  As he's heading upstairs, he starts laughing. He thinks he's going to find Goldilocks upstairs because he says he remembers reading the story last week in Reader's Digest.  Laughing, he opens the door to the bedroom and uncovers the Wolf.  He can't form any words out of fear but runs downstairs, grabs his family and smashes through the front door.  As they're running off into the distance, the narrator says, "So over the hill went the three Bears. Papa Bear, the Mama Bear, and the little 'bare behind'", and as Baby bear runs off into the distance, we see the rear end of his pants come down and his bare bottom showing.

Voice cast
Mel Blanc as Big Bad Wolf
Sara Berner as Mama Bear and Little Red Riding Hood
Tex Avery as Papa Bear
Bernice Hansen as Baby Bear and Goldilocks
Robert C. Bruce as Narrator

Music
 You Oughta Be in Pictures (1934, uncredited), by Dana Suesse
 Frühlingslied (Spring Song) Op.62#6 (1842, uncredited), by Felix Mendelssohn-Bartholdy
 Home, Sweet Home (1823, uncredited), by H.R. Bishop
 What's the Matter with Father (1910, uncredited), by Egbert Van Alstyne
 California, Here I Come (1924, uncredited), by Joseph Meyer
 Rock-a-bye Baby (1886, uncredited), by Effie I. Canning
 My Old Kentucky Home (1853, uncredited), by Stephen Foster
 The Lady in Red (1935, uncredited), by Allie Wrubel
 Prelude, Op. 28, No. 20 (Chopin) (uncredited), by Frédéric Chopin
 Put On Your Old Grey Bonnet (1909, uncredited), by Percy Wenrich
 Long, Long Ago (1883, uncredited), by Thomas Haynes Bayly
 Mary Had a Little Lamb (uncredited), Traditional
 Merrily We Roll Along (1937, uncredited), by Murray Mencher
 That Wonderful Mother of Mine by Walter Goodwin
 A-Tisket, A-Tasket Traditional
 Goodnight, Ladies Traditional

Notes
When the short's copyrights were sold to Associated Artists Productions, the Blue Ribbon titles were hacked off. This is the print seen on the LaserDisc, The Golden Age of Looney Tunes. In 1995, Turner Broadcasting System restored the Blue Ribbon titles for the short's American and European "dubbed" prints, although with most "dubbed" prints, the ending titles were hacked off in return.
When the short was released on Looney Tunes Golden Collection: Volume 5, the original opening and credits were restored.

References

External links
 

1940 films
Merrie Melodies short films
Warner Bros. Cartoons animated short films
Films directed by Tex Avery
1940s American animated films
Films scored by Carl Stalling
Animated crossover films
1940 animated films
1940s English-language films